Kyaa Hoga Nimmo Kaa (transl. What will happen to Nimmo) is an Indian comedy-drama television series produced by Balaji Telefilms that aired on Star One.

Story
Nimmo a girl from a middle-class family and the twists and turns in her life. Luck has never favoured this sweet and charming girl and she is often found to end up in circumstances which create much havoc. She still managed to remain fun-loving, confident and always had a positive approach towards life. Nimmo is very content and satisfied with whatever she does in life and whatever she has with herself. She shares a very strange relationship with God and together they share an extremely complex understanding. She is often found to be conversing with God and blaming Him for whatever happens in her life. Nimmo seems to accept her hard luck with high spirits until Kya Hoga Nimmo Ka takes a major turn and she falls in love with Vikrant (Sanjeet Bedi) who seems to be more interested in her sister. Meanwhile, Nimmo happens to meet Kunal Sehgal (Eijaz Khan). Kunal is from a very well-to-do family and is a playboy by reputation. A contractual marriage bonds them to each other and her life takes a complete turn when she is married to him. This turn is not only a surprise to her family but also to everyone else except Kanta Masi who is her confidante. But there is more to this marriage than that meets the eye. Ultimately Nimmo, with her poise and conduct, is able to manage everyone in the Sehgal household. Kunal's love interest Natasha becomes a major issue and Nimmo shifts away. It was late for Kunal to realize that he has fallen in love with Nimmo, but he manages to woo her back.

Cast
 Sanjeeda Sheikh as Namrata "Nimmo" Mathuria
 Eijaz Khan as Kunal Sehgal
 Jennifer Winget as Natasha 
  Tina Chaudhary as Swati Mathuria
 Anas Rashid as Karan Sehgal
 Dara Singh as Amardeep Sehgal
 Dolly Thakore as Preet Sehgal
 Garima Bhatnagar as Naina Mathuria, Nimmo's sister
 Navneet Nishan as Parminder Sehgal
 Ansha Sayed as Riti Sehgal
 Sanjeet Bedi as Vikrant 
 Sandeep Baswana as Palash
 Bharti Achrekar as Kanta Maasi
 Barkha Bisht as Naina
 Gautam Chaturvedi as Mr. Sehgal 
 Navjot Singh Sidhu as God
 Sujata Mehta
 Karan Wahi as Ranveer

References

Balaji Telefilms television series
Star One (Indian TV channel) original programming
Indian drama television series
2006 Indian television series debuts
2007 Indian television series endings